Constantius may refer to:


Emperors and consuls of Rome
 Constantius Chlorus (c. 250–306), junior Emperor of Rome (Caesar) from 293 to 305 and senior Emperor (Augustus) from 305 to 306
 Constantius II (317–361), Caesar from 324 and Augustus from 337 to 361
 Constantius Gallus (c. 325–354), Caesar from 351 to 354 and consul from 352 to 354, grandson of Constantius Chlorus 
 Constantius III, emperor of the Western Roman Empire in 421
 Constantius (consul 327), consul in 327

Religious figures
 Saints Simplicius, Constantius and Victorinus (died c. 159), Christian martyrs
 Saint Constantius of Perugia (died c. 170), one of the patron saints of Perugia, Italy
 Saint Constantius (Theban Legion) (c. 3rd century), a member of the legendary Theban Legion
 Constantius of Lyon, cleric who wrote the Vita Germani, a hagiography
 Saint Constantius of Aquino, 6th century bishop of Aquino
 Saint Constantius of Capri (died 7th or 8th century), Bishop of Capri

Other
 Constantius Africanus, (c. 1020–1085), translator of Greek and Islamic medical texts

See also
 Julius Constantius (after 289–337), Roman consul, son of Constantius Chlorus
 Constantine Constantius, a pseudonym of Søren Kierkegaard
 Constantine (disambiguation)

Masculine given names